Standfussiana sturanyi is a species of owlet moth in the genus Standfussiana. It was described by Hans Rebel in 1906 as Agrotis sturanyi.

References

Moths described in 1906
Noctuinae